The Synagogue of Castelo de Vide is a well-preserved medieval synagogue in Santa Maria da Devesa, Castelo de Vide, Portugal. Along with the Synagogue of Tomar, it is one of two existing pre-expulsion synagogues in the country. Built in the late 14th century, it now houses a museum dedicated to Castelo de Vide's historical Jewish community.

History
The Synagogue of Castelo de Vide was built sometime in the late 14th century. Written documents attest to the existence of Castelo de Vide's Jewish community and Jewish quarter throughout the 14th and 15th centuries. Though King Manuel I of Portugal ordered the forced conversion or expulsion of Portuguese Jews in 1496, Marranos continued using the synagogue as a religious sanctuary and school until the mid 16th century.

Over the succeeding centuries the synagogue had various uses, including an 18th-century alteration into a private home. The building was restored and its tabernacle rediscovered in 1972. Today it houses a small museum dedicated to Castelo de Vide's historical Jewish community. The structure is listed as a Building of Public Interest (Imóvel de Interesse Público) by the Portuguese government.

Architecture
The Synagogue of Castelo de Vide is one of two existing preserved medieval synagogues in Portugal. The other is the Synagogue of Tomar. Four pre-expulsion synagogue buildings exist in neighboring Spain: Híjar Synagogue, the Synagogue of Santa María la Blanca and Synagogue of El Tránsito in Toledo, and Córdoba Synagogue. All other existing Portuguese synagogues were built after the Portuguese Inquisition ended in 1821.

The synagogue is a small two-story building originally constructed in the late 14th century and altered over time. It is oriented east–west. Ogival stone arches frame all of the building's doors. A mezuzah containing part of the Shema Yisrael prayer is placed over one of the ground floor doors.

Inside the building exists a 15th-century carved stone Torah ark or tabernacle (referred to as a hekhal by Sephardic communities) which was rediscovered in 1972 during repairs to the exterior walls. The ark's left scripture pedestal is decorated with seven balls symbolizing the six days of creation and one day of rest.

References

External links
Synagogue of Castelo de Vide Official Webpage (in English, Portuguese, and Spanish)

Synagogues in Portugal
14th-century synagogues
Synagogues preserved as museums
Sephardi synagogues